The lieutenant governor of Washington is an elected office in the U.S. state of Washington. The incumbent is Denny Heck, a Democrat who began his term in January 2021. The lieutenant governor serves as president of the Washington State Senate, fills in as acting governor whenever the governor leaves the state or is unable to serve, and assumes the duties of governor in case of a vacancy.

There have been 17 holders of the office, three of whom have ascended to the office of governor of Washington. Prior to statehood, there were 10 territorial secretaries of state of Washington that acted in the territorial governor's absence, but were unable to ascend to governor.

List of lieutenant governors of Washington
Parties

References

 

Washington